Santa Cruz is a city  in the state of Pernambuco, Brazil. The population in 2020, according with IBGE was 15,558 and the area is 1245.9 km².

Geography

 State - Pernambuco
 Region - Sertão Pernambucano
 Boundaries - Ouricuri   (N);  Lagoa Grande  (S);  Parnamirim  and Santa Maria da Boa Vista  (E);  Dormentes and Santa Filomena   (W)
 Area - 1255.9 km²
 Elevation - 515 m
 Hydrography - Brigida and Garças rivers
 Vegetation - Caatinga Hiperxerófila
 Climate - semi arid - hot and dry
 Annual average temperature - 25.0 c
 Distance to Recife - 731 km

Economy

The main economic activities in Santa Cruz are based in agribusiness, especially creation of goats, cattle, sheep, and plantations of tomatoes and manioc.

Economic Indicators

Economy by Sector
2006

Health Indicators

References

Municipalities in Pernambuco